Calder Park may refer to the following:

Calder Park, Victoria, a suburb of Melbourne, Australia
Calder Park Raceway, a motor racing circuit in Calder Park, Victoria
Calder Park, Aberdeen, a proposed football stadium in Aberdeen, Scotland